Michael Worobey is a Canadian evolutionary biologist, and a professor and department head of Ecology and Evolutionary Biology at the University of Arizona. In May 2021, Worobey signed a letter, published in the journal Science, calling for a thorough investigation into the origins of COVID-19, including the possibility of a lab leak. Then, after thoroughly analyzing the available data, Worobey hypothesized that the virus most likely originated with animals sold at the Huanan Seafood Wholesale Market and subsequently jumped to humans.

References

Canadian biologists
University of Arizona faculty
Living people
Year of birth missing (living people)
20th-century births